The Anguille Group is a geologic group in Newfoundland and Labrador. It preserves fossils dating back to the Carboniferous period.

See also

 List of fossiliferous stratigraphic units in Newfoundland and Labrador

References
 

Carboniferous Newfoundland and Labrador